Great Mutiny could refer to:
 Indian Rebellion of 1857
 Great Naval Mutiny 1797 - Spithead and Nore mutinies